Bonsignore is a surname. Notable people with the surname include:

Ferdinando Bonsignore (1760–1843) – Italian architect and designer
Gregory Bonsignore, American playwright and screenwriter
Jason Bonsignore, American hockey player
Justin Bonsignore (born 1988), American racing driver 
Michael Bonsignore, American business executive
Vito Bonsignore (born 1943), Italian politician 
Miles Bonsignore, American podcast producer for the Try Guys, host of the Perfect Person podcast, and UNC Chapel Hill alum